FEPASA may refer to:

 Ferrovia Paulista S.A., in Brazil. Railway company, owned by the State of São Paulo, between 1971 and 1998, when it was incorporated into RFFSA, privatized and nowadays operated by América Latina Logística
 Ferrocarril del Pacífico, in Chile
Ferrocarriles del Paraguay S.A., national railway company of Paraguay established in 2002